This list of works by Robert A. M. Stern categorizes the architect's work. Stern has established an extremely prolific career in the span of six decades, and has designed some of the tallest buildings in New York City and the United States. He has also contributed extensively to college campuses across the country, having designed buildings on the campuses of Georgetown University, Johns Hopkins University, and every Ivy League school except Cornell.

Notable architectural projects

Major projects of Robert Stern and his architecture firm RAMSA include:
1993: Norman Rockwell Museum
1999: Smith Campus Center – Pomona College
2001: Federal Reserve Bank of Atlanta – Atlanta, Georgia
2001: Nashville Public Library – Nashville, Tennessee
2005: Jacksonville Public Library - Jacksonville, Florida
2006: Gerald R. Ford School of Public Policy at the University of Michigan
2007: Ocean Course Club House – Kiawah Island
2007: Superior Ink – New York City 
2008: 15 Central Park West – New York City 
2008: Comcast Center – Philadelphia, Pennsylvania
2008: Mandarin Oriental, Atlanta – Atlanta
2008: Lakewood Public Library - Lakewood, Ohio
2009: Mason School of Business at the College of William and Mary
2010: Tour Carpe Diem – La Défense, Paris
2012: Aquatics and Fitness Center at Brown University, Providence, Rhode Island
2013: George W. Bush Presidential Library – Southern Methodist University in Dallas, Texas
2015: Immanuel Chapel at Virginia Theological Seminary – Alexandria, Virginia
2016: Four Seasons Hotel New York Downtown, hotel/residence tower developed by Larry Silverstein near his rebuilt World Trade Center complex.
2017: Two residential colleges at Yale University near Ingalls Rink
2017: Harvard Kennedy School campus transformation project including the Batia and Idan Ofer Building, the Leslie H. Wexner Building, and the expansion of the David M. Rubenstein Building, Cambridge, Massachusetts
2019: 1331 Maryland Ave SW, Washington, D.C., apartments near the 14th Street Bridge
2019: Colony Hall, adjacent to the Paul Mellon Arts Center at Choate Rosemary Hall

Current architectural projects
As of August 2015, Stern and his office RAMSA lead the following projects:
1601 Vine Street – built in conjunction with the Mormon Temple in Philadelphia
220 Central Park South, skyscraper – Manhattan, New York City 
30 Park Place, skyscraper – Manhattan, New York City
One Bennett Park, skyscraper – Chicago, IL
520 Park Avenue, skyscraper – Manhattan, New York City
Audley Square House, apartment/townhouse complex – London
Museum of the American Revolution – design for the museum, opened in 2017
20 East End Avenue, condominium – Manhattan, New York City
Camden Waterfront – Camden, New Jersey
70 Vestry, condominium – Manhattan, New York City

See also
New Classical architecture

References

Stern, Robert A.M.
Robert A. M. Stern buildings